Through 2019, the UCLA Bruins have played in 36 bowl games,  compiling a record of .

After California's third straight Rose Bowl loss in 1951, the Pacific Coast Conference disallowed consecutive appearances. The first PCC program adversely affected was UCLA; the undefeated and second-ranked 1954 team was ineligible for the 1955 Rose Bowl; it would have been the second of three consecutive. The rule was dropped by the succeeding AAWU (Big Five) in 1959 (Washington won in 1960 and 1961), but the Big Ten kept it from the late 1940s until the early 1970s.

The Pac-8 (and Big Ten) did not allow multiple bowl teams until the 1975 season, in which the Bruins won the Rose Bowl. In twelve Rose Bowl appearances, UCLA has won five, with three streaks: five losses, five wins, and currently two losses. The last victory was in January 1986 (third in four years), and the most recent appearance was in 1999.

Key

Bowl games

Note: UCLA also played in the 1939 Pineapple Bowl, beating Hawaii W 32–7. However, the NCAA does not consider it a Major Bowl, and therefore does not count it towards a team's bowl record as it was a pre-scheduled game.

Game notes

1943 Rose Bowl

1st quarter scoring: No score

2nd quarter scoring: No score

3rd quarter scoring: No score

4th quarter scoring: Georgia – Willard "Red" Boyd blocks Bob Waterfield's punt out of bounds for an automatic safety; Georgia – Frank Sinkwich, one-yard run (Leo Costa converts)

1947 Rose Bowl

1954 Rose Bowl
 In the fourth quarter, the Bruins recovered another Spartan fumble and scored to make the score 21–20. But the extra point kick failed. Billy Wells of Michigan State returned a punt 62 yards for a touchdown with 4:51 left in the game.

1956 Rose Bowl

1962 Rose Bowl

1966 Rose Bowl

1976 Rose Bowl

1983 Rose Bowl

1984 Rose Bowl

1985 Fiesta Bowl

1986 Rose Bowl

The 72nd Rose Bowl Game played on January 1, 1986. Between The UCLA Bruins upset the Iowa Hawkeyes.  The UCLA Bruins upset the Iowa Hawkeyes 45–28. UCLA tailback Eric Ball was named the Player Of The Game. He ran for a Rose Bowl record four touchdowns and was MVP of the game. The game Attendance was 103,292.

1994 Rose Bowl

The weather was 73 degrees and hazy. UCLA receiver J. J. Stokes set Rose Bowl records for receptions (14) and receiving yards (176).  Brent Moss gashed the UCLA defense for 158 rushing yards and 2 TDs.

First quarter scoring: UCLA — Bjorn Merten 27-yard field goal; Wisconsin — Brent Moss three-yard run (Rick Schnetzky kick)

Second quarter scoring: Wisconsin — Moss one-yard run (Schnetzky kick)

Third quarter scoring: No Scoring

Fourth quarter scoring: UCLA — Ricky Davis 12-yard run (Merten kick); Wisconsin — Darrell Bevell 21-yard run (Schnetzky kick); UCLA — Mike Nguyen five-yard pass from Wayne Cook (2-point conversion pass failed)

Statistics

1995 Aloha Bowl

First quarter scoring: KU—Jim Moore, nine-yard pass from Mark Williams. Jeff McCord converts.

Second quarter scoring: KU—June Henley, 49-yard run. McCord converts; KU—McCord, 27-yard field goal.

Third quarter scoring KU—Henley, two-yard run. McCord kick fails; UCLA—Brad Melsby, eight-yard pass from Cade McNown (Bjorn Merten kick); KU—Isaac Byrd, 77-yard pass from Williams (McCord converts); KU—Andre Carter, 27-yard pass from Williams (McCord converts)

Fourth quarter scoring UCLA—Kevin Jordan, eight-yard pass from McNown (Merten kick); UCLA — Karim Abdul-Jabbar five-yard run (Melsby pass from McNown); KU—Williams, six-yard run (McCord converts); UCLA—Melsby, seven-yard pass from McNown (Abdul-Jabbar run); KU—Eric Vann, 67-yard run (McCord converts)

1998 Cotton Bowl Classic

Sources:

1999 Rose Bowl

Sources:

2000 Sun Bowl

Sources:

2002 Las Vegas Bowl

Sources:

2003 Silicon Valley Bowl

Sources:

2004 Las Vegas Bowl

Sources:

2005 Sun Bowl

Sources:

2006 Emerald Bowl

Sources:

On February 8, 2010, Florida State University agreed to accept NCAA sanctions against its athletic programs, and agreed to vacate 12 football victories, including the 2006 Emerald Bowl victory over UCLA. Florida State has stated their intention to return the championship trophy.

2007 Las Vegas Bowl

Sources:

2009 EagleBank Bowl

Sources:

2011 Kraft Fight Hunger Bowl

Sources:

2012 Bridgepoint Education Holiday Bowl

Baylor (8–5) vs No. 17 UCLA (9–5)

2013 80th Hyundai Sun Bowl 

Virginia Tech (8–5,5–3) vs. No. 17 UCLA (10–3,6–3)

2015 22nd Valero Alamo Bowl 

#11 Kansas State (9–3,7–2) vs. No. 14 UCLA (9–3,6–3)

2017 Cactus Bowl

Kansas State Wildcats (7–5) vs. UCLA Bruins (6–6)

2021 Holiday Bowl

No. 18 NC State Wolfpack (9–3) vs. UCLA Bruins (8–4)

References
General

Specific

UCLA Bruins

Bruins
UCLA Bruins bowl games